Jerry Denstorff (born December 25, 1936) is a former American football player and coach.
He served as the head football coach at Bloomsburg University of Pennsylvania from 1968 to 1970, compiling a record of 10–13–1.
He played college football at Louisiana State University in 1954 and 1955 before transferring to Evansville College.  Following a successful Senior (1959) campaign, Denstorff was named 1st team "All-ICC".

After leaving, Bloomsburg State; Denstorff began a 19-year career as the Head Coach in his hometown (Rockport, Indiana); he retired with a career HS coaching record of 153-76 (.668), 7 Conference titles and a State Finalist berth in the 1988 season as the Rebels finished the year at 12-2.

References

External links
 Evansville Hall of Fame profile

1936 births
Living people
Bloomsburg Huskies football coaches
Evansville Purple Aces football players
LSU Tigers football players
High school football coaches in Indiana
People from Danville, Illinois
Players of American football from Illinois